"Sweet Memories" is a song by Mickey Newbury, brought to success by Andy Williams.  The song reached #4 on the adult contemporary chart and #75 on the Billboard chart in 1968.

Other versions include those by Willie Nelson, Brenda Lee & Ricky Van Shelton, Ray Charles & Mary Ann, Anita Carter, The Everly Brothers, and Roy Orbison.

Willie Nelson version

Willie Nelson released a version of the song in January 1979 and was the second single from his album Sweet Memories. The song peaked at #4 on the Billboard Hot Country Singles chart. It also reached #1 on the RPM Country Tracks chart in Canada.

Chart performance

References

1968 singles
1979 singles
Songs written by Mickey Newbury
Andy Williams songs
Willie Nelson songs
Columbia Records singles
RCA Records singles
1968 songs